David, Dave, or Dai Evans may refer to:

Academics
 Sir David Emrys Evans (1891–1966), Welsh classicist and university principal
 David Evans (microbiologist) (1909–1984), British microbiologist
 David Stanley Evans (1916–2004), British astronomer
 David C. Evans (1924–1998), American computer graphics pioneer
 David C. Evans (paleontologist) (born 1980), Canadian paleontologist
 David Evans (mathematician) (born 1940), professor of applied mathematics at University of Bristol
 David A. Evans (1941–2022), organic chemist at Harvard University
 David Andreoff Evans (born 1948), American computational linguist, entrepreneur
 David S. Evans (born 1954), economist and lecturer at University College London and the University of Chicago Law School
 David Evans (Yale professor) (born 1970), professor of geology and geophysics at Yale University
 David E. Evans (born 1950), professor of mathematics at Cardiff University
 David Evans (musicologist) (born 1944), ethnomusicologist at the University of Memphis
 Dai Morgan Evans (1944–2017), British archaeologist and academic
 David Evans (geneticist), Australian geneticist

Artists

Musicians 
 David Evans (composer) (1874–1948), Welsh composer
 Dave Evans (bluegrass) (1950–2017), American tenor singer and banjo player
 Dave Evans (singer) (born 1953), first lead singer of the rock band AC/DC
 David Howell Evans (born 1961), guitarist of Irish rock band U2, better known as The Edge

Other arts 
 David Evans (writer) (1893–1966), British screenwriter and novelist
 David Allan Evans (born 1940), American poet
 David Mickey Evans (born 1962), American film director and screenwriter
 David Evans (director), director of British film Fever Pitch and various TV shows
 David Evans (sculptor) (1893–1959), English sculptor
 David Evans (comedian) (1922–1980), English comedian

Politicians
 David Evans (MP for Cardiff) (died 1568), MP for Cardiff
 David R. Evans (South Carolina politician) (1769–1843), U.S. Representative from South Carolina
 David Ellicott Evans (1788–1850), U.S. Representative from New York, 1827
 David H. Evans (1837–1920), New York politician
 David Arthur Evans (1915–1989), Canadian politician in the Legislative Assembly of Ontario
 David Evans (Western Australian politician) (1924–2019), Australian politician in the Western Australian Legislative Assembly
 David Evans (Victorian politician) (born 1934), Australian politician in the Victorian Legislative Council
 David Evans (British politician) (1935–2008), British businessman and Conservative politician, MP 1987–1997
 David Evans (West Virginia politician) (born 1945), member of the West Virginia House of Delegates
 David W. Evans (born 1946), U.S. Representative from Indiana, 1975–1983
 David Evans, Jr. (1848–1929), Wisconsin politician
 David Evans (political official) (born 1961), British political official and General Secretary of the Labour Party

Religion 
 David Evans (canon at St Asaph) (1705–1788), Welsh clergyman and writer
 David Evans (archdeacon of St Asaph) (died 1910), Welsh priest
 David F. Evans (born 1951), American leader in The Church of Jesus Christ of Latter-day Saints
 David Evans (bishop) (born 1938), Peruvian bishop
 David E.C. Evans (born 1953), Auxiliary Bishop of Birmingham Archdiocese

Sportsmen
 Dai Evans (footballer, born 1902) (1902–1951), Welsh international footballer
 Dai Evans (footballer, born 1934), Welsh football goalkeeper
 Dave Evans (racing driver) (1898–1974), American racecar driver
 Dave Evans (footballer) (born 1958), English footballer
 David Evans (athlete) (born 1967), Australian Paralympian
 David Evans (footballer) (born 1967), former soccer player/footballer with Chester City
 David Evans (squash player) (born 1974), Welsh professional squash player
 David Evans (darts player) (born 1989), English darts player
 David Evans, one of the three falsely accused students in 2006 Duke University lacrosse case

Cricket
 David Evans (cricketer, born 1869) (1869–1907), 22 first-class matches between 1889 and 1902
 David Evans (Hertfordshire cricketer) (1935–2008), List A cricketer with Hertfordshire
 David Evans (Somerset cricketer, born 1928) (1928–1991), eight first-class matches in 1953
 David Evans (umpire) (1933–1990), cricketer with Glamorgan and Test match umpire

Rugby
 Dai Evans (1872–1912), Welsh rugby union player
 David Evans (rugby) (1886–1940), New Zealand rugby union and rugby league footballer of the 1900s and 1910s
 David Morgan Evans (1911–1941), Welsh rugby union and rugby league footballer
 David Wyn Evans (born 1965), Welsh rugby union player
 David Evans (rugby union) (born 1988), Welsh rugby union and rugby sevens player

Others
 Dave Evans (entrepreneur), American entrepreneur and Stanford professor
 Dave Evans (reporter) (born 1962), American reporter with WABC-TV
 David Morier Evans (1819–1874), financial journalist
 Sir David William Evans (1866–1926), Welsh lawyer, public servant and rugby international
 Sir David Evans (archivist) (1893–1987), Welsh archivist, Keeper of the Public Records
 Sir David Evans (RAF officer) (1924–2020), Air Chief Marshal/Senior Commander in the Royal Air Force (RAF)
 David Evans (RAAF officer) (1925–2020), Senior officer in the Royal Australian Air Force (RAAF)
 David Evans, Baron Evans of Watford (born 1942), British trade unionist and businessman
 David Evans (administrator) (born 1960), American relief organisation officer
 David Evans (mathematician and engineer), worked for the Australian Greenhouse Office
 David Morier Evans (1819–1874), Welsh financial journalist
 David Evans (department store), a department store group based in South Wales